Eeke Geertruida van Nes (born 17 April 1969) is a retired rower from the Netherlands. She won three Olympic medals, a bronze in the double sculls in 1996, with Irene Eijs, and two silver medals in 2000, in eights and double sculls. Between 1995 and 1999 she won four medals at the world championships.

Van Nes is a daughter of the rowers Hadriaan van Nes and Meike de Vlas and granddaughter of football player Jan Thomée.

References

1969 births
Living people
Dutch female rowers
Rowers at the 1996 Summer Olympics
Rowers at the 2000 Summer Olympics
Olympic rowers of the Netherlands
Olympic silver medalists for the Netherlands
Olympic bronze medalists for the Netherlands
Sportspeople from Delft
Olympic medalists in rowing
World Rowing Championships medalists for the Netherlands
Medalists at the 2000 Summer Olympics
Medalists at the 1996 Summer Olympics